The women's 1500 metres at the 2007 All-Africa Games were held on July 21–22.

Medalists

Results

Heats
Qualification: First 4 of each heat (Q) and the next 4 fastest (q) qualified for the semifinals.

Final

References
Results

1500